List of retired aircraft types used by Polish Air Force
Aircraft whose service end date is 1939 were captured or destroyed following the 1939 Invasion of Poland.

References

Citations

Bibliography

Polish Air Force
Polish,Retired
Aircraft